"All Cried Out" is a song recorded by American band Lisa Lisa and Cult Jam from their 1985 album Lisa Lisa & Cult Jam with Full Force. The song became a major hit, reaching number eight on the US Billboard Hot 100 chart in October 1986. It was also a major hit on the US R&B singles chart, peaking at number three.

The actual artist credit on the record label of the 7-inch vinyl release was listed as Lisa Lisa and Cult Jam with Full Force featuring Paul Anthony & Bow Legged Lou.

Charts

Weekly charts

Year-end charts

Allure version

In 1997, American contemporary R&B group Allure included their version of "All Cried Out" on their eponymous debut studio album (1997). The song features fellow R&B group 112 and was produced by Cory Rooney, Walter Afanasieff and Mariah Carey.

Allure's version became the group's biggest hit, peaking at number four on the US Billboard Hot 100 the week of November 22, 1997. The single was eventually certified gold for shipments exceeding 500,000; it ultimately sold over 800,000. It charted on the Billboard Year-End charts for two years in a row, reaching number 43 on the 1997 chart and number 84 on the 1998 chart.

Critical reception
British magazine Music Week rated the song four out of five, stating that "this ballad shows the four girls' voices at their full potential."

Music video

The official music video for the song was directed by Christopher Erskin.

Single track listing
"All Cried Out" (Radio Edit)- 3:38
"All Cried Out" (Hex Hector Radio Mix)- 4:44
"All Cried Out" (Hex Hector Dub Mix)- 7:49
"All Cried Out" (Hex Hector Main Club Pass)- 10:50

Charts

Weekly charts

Year-end charts

Certifications

References

112 (band) songs
1986 singles
1997 singles
Allure (band) songs
Columbia Records singles
Crave Records singles
Lisa Lisa and Cult Jam songs
Music videos directed by Christopher Erskin
Contemporary R&B ballads
Song recordings produced by Walter Afanasieff
Song recordings produced by Full Force